Calvary is the hill in Jerusalem where Jesus was crucified.

Calvary may also refer to:

Religion
 Calvary (sanctuary), a type of monumental stations of the cross built on the slopes of a hill
 Calvary (monument), a type of monumental public Christian cross, sometimes encased in an open shrine

Arts and entertainment
 Calvary (2014 film), a 2014 film
 Calvary (1920 film), a 1920 British silent drama film
 Calvary (Amstel), a 1525–1549 copy of a lost painting by Jan van Amstel
 "Calvary" (Angel), a 2003 episode of the television series Angel
 Calvary (Antonello da Messina), a 1475 painting by Antonello da Messina
 Calvary, Charles Bridge, a sculpture by Emanuel Max in Prague, Czech Republic
 Calvary of Hendrik van Rijn, a 1363 painting commissioned by van Rijn
 Calvary, a 1971 opera by Thomas Pasatieri
 Our Lady of Calvary, a 17th-century painting in the shrine of Kalwaria Zebrzydowska, Poland

People
 Casey Calvary (born 1979), American basketball player
 Calvary Morris (1798–1871), a U.S. politician
 Calvary M. Young (1840–1909), an American soldier who fought in the American Civil War

Places

United States
 Calvary, Georgia
 Calvary, Virginia
 Calvary, Wisconsin

Other places
 Góra Kalwaria, Poland
 Kalvarija, Lithuania
 Kalwaria Zebrzydowska, Poland
 Sacred Mount Calvary of Domodossola, Italy

Other uses
 Calvary (CRT station), a Chicago Rapid Transit station
 Calvary Comics, a comic book publisher
 Calvary Hospital, Canberra, a public hospital in Bruce, A.C.T., Australia
 Calvary station (C&NW), a former commuter rail station in Evanston, Illinois, U.S.
 Calvary University, Kansas City, Missouri, U.S.

See also
 Calvary Cemetery (disambiguation)
 Calvary Church (disambiguation), the name of a number of churches
 Calvaria (disambiguation)
 Calvaire (disambiguation)
 Kalvarija (disambiguation)
 Kalwaria (disambiguation)
 Calfaria (disambiguation)
 Mount Calvary (disambiguation)
 Golgotha (disambiguation)